Alan Edden Huckle (born 15 June 1948) is an English senior diplomat in the Foreign and Commonwealth Office of the British Government. He was the commissioner of the British Indian Ocean Territory (BIOT) and the British Antarctic Territory from 23 April 2001 until 12 January 2004, when he left to become the governor of Anguilla in the Caribbean. He was the Governor of Anguilla from 29 July 2004 to July 2006, having been appointed in July 2003.

In July 2005 it was announced that Huckle would soon be leaving Anguilla to become Governor of the British Overseas Territory of the Falkland Islands and the Commissioner for South Georgia and the South Sandwich Islands, all of which are located in the South Atlantic Ocean. He was succeeded in Anguilla by Andrew George, on 10 July 2006.

During his time as Governor of the Falkland Islands, Huckle oversaw the implementation of the new Constitution in 2009. He was succeeded as Governor by Nigel Haywood in October 2010.

External links
Reference to Huckle's tenure at BIOT and British Antarctic Territory, worldstatesmen.org; accessed 7 September 2014.

1948 births
Living people
Commissioners of the British Antarctic Territory
Commissioners of the British Indian Ocean Territory
Commissioners for South Georgia and the South Sandwich Islands
Governors of Anguilla
Governors of the Falkland Islands
Place of birth missing (living people)